Roderick Louis Mullen (born December 5, 1972) is a former American football cornerback who played for the Green Bay Packers (1995–1998) and the Carolina Panthers (1999) in the National Football League. With the Green Bay Packers, he became a champion in Super Bowl XXXI, beating the New England Patriots.

Professional career

New York Giants 
Mullen was drafted by the New York Giants in the 1995 NFL Draft (5th round, 153rd overall). Mullen was cut by the Giants on August 28, 1995. He was later signed to the practice squad.

Green Bay Packers 
The Green Bay Packers signed Mullen off the Giants' practice squad in late October 1995. He made three tackles that first partial season. In 1996, Mullen played in 14 games as part of the Packers' Super Bowl XXXI championship team. Playing in nickel and dime situations as well as on special teams, he contributed in all 16 games in 1997. Mullen did not play at all in 1998 with a dislocated shoulder. After 1998, Mullen left the team.

Carolina Panthers 
Ending his time as an unrestricted free agent, Mullen was signed by the Carolina Panthers in March 1999. He recorded 24 tackles in 15 games played in his lone season with the Panthers.

Minnesota Vikings 
On June 15, 2000, the Minnesota Vikings signed Mullen. He was cut by the Vikings on August 27, 2000.

Post-career life 
After ending his playing career, Mullen invested in Subway as a restaurant franchiser near Los Angeles. He then relocated to Dallas and is now working as an executive for a gym company in the area.<ref></refHennd

References

1972 births
Living people
Players of American football from Baton Rouge, Louisiana
American football cornerbacks
Grambling State Tigers football players
Green Bay Packers players
Carolina Panthers players